Nguyễn Đình Thuận (June 5, 1923 – June 3, 2013) was the Secretary of State under President Ngo Dinh Diem of South Vietnam.
After Ngô Đình Diệm was overthrown and then killed in the 1963 South Vietnamese coup, Nguyễn Đình Thuận moved to France to live with his brother.

He died in 2013 in Boulogne-Billancourt.

References 

Government ministers of Vietnam